Matrix Partners is a US-based private equity investment firm focusing on venture capital investments.  The firm invests in seed and early-stage companies in the United States and India, particularly in the software, communications, semiconductors, data storage, Internet or wireless sectors.

The firm is headquartered in Palo Alto, California, and has offices in Cambridge, Massachusetts; Mumbai, India; and Beijing, China.

History 
Founded in 1977, Matrix was an active player in the development of the venture capital industry in the 1980s. The firm's direct predecessor, Hellman Ferri Investment Associates (1977 to 1982), was founded by Paul J. Ferri and Warren Hellman. In 1982, Ferri and Hellman split ways and Ferri went to focus on early-stage companies, forming Matrix in Boston, Massachusetts while Hellman founded the San Francisco-based private equity firm, Hellman & Friedman which focused on later-stage firm investments.

Among the firm's notable investments, Matrix Partners was an early-stage investor in Apple Inc., Arrowpoint Communications, Digium, JBoss, JustFab, PSINet, SanDisk, Silverstream Software, TheLadders.com, Sonus Networks, Tivoli Software, Tollbridge Technologies, VERITAS Software, Vermeer Technologies Incorporated, and Xilinx.

In 1985, Matrix raised its first institutional private equity fund. In 2001, Matrix Partners completed fundraising for Matrix Partners VII, a $1 billion venture capital fund.  In 2006, Matrix raised Matrix Partners VIII fund, with $445 million of investor commitments. In 2006, Matrix also raised a separate $150 million India fund. In July 2009, Matrix raised Matrix IX fund with $600 million. As of 2018, the firm has raised eleven U.S venture capital funds and five China focused funds. In November 2021, The Wall Street Journal reported that Matrix Partners is a major investor in Chinese semiconductor firms, raising U.S. national security concerns.

References

External links 

Venture capital firms of the United States
Financial services companies established in 1977
1977 establishments in California